The Pacific and Idaho Northern Railroad Depot is a building in the western United States, at New Meadows, Idaho, and is listed on the National Register of Historic Places.

Located on the west side of town, it is just south of Virginia Street (U.S. 95) on the west side of South Commercial Avenue.

See also
 List of National Historic Landmarks in Idaho
 National Register of Historic Places listings in Adams County, Idaho

References

1911 establishments in Oregon
Buildings and structures in Adams County, Idaho
Former railway stations in Idaho
Italianate architecture in Idaho
National Register of Historic Places in Adams County, Idaho
Railway stations in the United States opened in 1911
Railway stations on the National Register of Historic Places in Idaho